Alfredo Torres Pereira was a Portuguese footballer who played as forward.

External links 
 
 

Portuguese footballers
Association football forwards
Sporting CP footballers
Portugal international footballers
Year of death missing
Year of birth missing
Place of birth missing